The lesser grass finch (Emberizoides ypiranganus), also known as the grey-cheeked grass-finch, is a species of bird in the family Thraupidae; it was formerly placed in the Emberizidae.

It is found in Argentina, Brazil, Paraguay, and Uruguay. Its natural habitats are temperate grassland and swamps.

References

Emberizoides
Birds described in 1907
Taxonomy articles created by Polbot